This article lists anatomical variations that are not deemed inherently pathological.

Accessory features

Bones
 Cervical rib
 Fabella
 Foramen tympanicum
 Supracondylar process of the humerus
 Sternal foramen
 Stafne bone cavity
 Episternal ossicles
 Fossa navicularis magna
 Transverse basilar fissure - or Saucer's fissure
 Canalis basilaris medianus
 Craniopharyngeal canal
 Intermediate condylar canal
 Foramen arcuale
 Os odontoideum 
 Os acromiale
 Ossiculum terminale (of dens)
 Scapular foramina and tunnels

Muscles

 Accessory soleus muscle
 Axillary arch
 Epitrochleoanconeus muscle - or anconeous epitrochlearis 
 Extensor medii proprius muscle
 Extensor digitorum brevis manus muscle
 Extensor indicis et medii communis muscle
 Extensor pollicis et indicis communis muscle
 Extensor carpi radialis tertius muscle - or extensor carpi radialis accessorius 
 Linburg-Comstock variation - or conjoint flexor pollicis longus and flexor digitorum profundus of the index
 Sternalis muscle - or rectus thoracis
 Psoas minor muscle
 Palmaris profundus muscle
 Pterygoideus proprius muscle
 Styloauricularis muscle
 Transversus nuchae muscle
 Accessory popliteus muscle
 Tensor fasciae suralis muscle
 Sternoclavicularis anticus muscle
 Gluteoperinealis muscle
 Gantzer's muscle
 Levator claviculae muscle
 Chondrocoracoideus muscle

Vasculature
Double cystic artery

Glands
 Accessory parotid gland
 Zuckerkandl's tubercle

Organs
 Accessory spleen
 Azygos lobe of the lung
 Tracheal bronchus
 Hirsuties coronae glandis
 Cardiac bronchus

Other
 Accessory pancreatic duct
 Accessory nail of the fifth toe
 Darwin's tubercle
 Vein of foramen caecum
 Osborne's ligament
 Gastropancreatic ligament
 Diagonal ear lobe crease
 Preauricular sinus

Lacking features

Muscles
 Risorius
 Psoas minor
 Absence of the palmaris longus
 Dividement of the piriformis
 Missing or underdeveloped pectoralis major is called Poland's syndrome

Other
 Appendix
 Agenesis of wisdom teeth
 Empty sella turcica

Varying features

Bones
 Sesamoid bone of the second, third, fourth and fifth finger
 Manubriosternal fusion
 Sternoxiphoidal fusion

Muscles

 Myocardial bridge

Nerves
 Nerve of Mckenzie

Vasculature
Artery of Percheron
Variation of basilic vein
Median artery
Thyroid ima artery
 Superficial ulnar artery
Marginal artery of the colon
Persistent primitive olfactory artery
 Arc of Bühler
 Stapedial artery
 Hypoglossal artery
 Corona mortis

Other
Anisocoria
Appendix
Crease of the upper eyelid – having either a "single" or "double" eyelid
Epicanthic fold
Lateral arcuate ligament
Horseshoe kidney - also known as ren arcuatus

See also 
 Supernumerary body part
 Congenital anomalies
 Psoas minor muscle

 
Variations